The EuroSTAR Conference is the premier and largest gathering of European software testing professionals. The 2023 EuroSTAR Software Testing Conference will take place at Antwerp Zoo, Belgium, 13-16 June 2023.

History of EuroSTAR Software Testing
The first EuroSTAR conference took place in London in October 1993 as a sister conference of (US-based) STAR Conferences organised by William C. Hetzel and Gelperin in conjunction with the British Computer Society.

EuroSTAR stands for European Software Testing Analysis & Review.

EuroSTAR is the longest running and largest European software testing and quality assurance conference that takes place in a different European city each year. Cities visited so far include London (1993, 1995) Brussels (1994, 1997) Amsterdam (1996, 2003, 2012), Edinburgh (1997, 2002), Munich (1998), Barcelona (1999), Copenhagen (2000, 2005, 2010, 2017, 2022), Manchester (2006, 2011), Stockholm (2001, 2007, 2009, 2016), Cologne (2004), The Hague (2008, 2018), Dublin (2014),  Maastricht (2015), and Prague (2019). The annual conference has been the origin of many notable milestones in the history of software testing including the introduction of the W-Model by Paul Herzlich in 1993, the foundation of Dutch Special Interest Group in Software Testing (SIGIST) TestNet at EuroSTAR 1996   and the foundation of the Test Lab (2009) which has since become a focal point at many international conferences on software testing. Proceedings at EuroSTAR have been cited in many publications on software testing and the conference is regularly featured on best international software testing conference lists and IT journals.

EuroSTAR Testing Excellence Award 
The EuroSTAR European Testing Excellence Award has been awarded at the annual EuroSTAR Conference since 1998. The award seeks to recognise significant contributions to the field of software testing in Europe. Notable past winners of the European Testing Excellence Award include Martin Pol, Dorothy Graham, Tim Koomen, Geoff Thompson and Gerald Weinberg.

References

External links

Computer conferences
International conferences
Recurring events established in 1993